Lekkerkerker is a Dutch surname. Notable people with the surname include:

 Brad Lekkerkerker (born 1978), American footballer
 Cory Lekkerkerker (born 1981), former American footballer (younger brother of Brad Lekkerkerker)
 Gerrit Lekkerkerker (1922—1999), Dutch mathematician

Dutch-language surnames